Asgharabad may refer to:

Isfahan Province
Asgharabad, Isfahan, a city in Khomeyni Shahr County

Kurdistan Province
Ashgarabad, Kurdistan, a village in Saqqez County

Lorestan Province
Asgharabad, Borujerd, a village in Borujerd County
Asgharabad, Khorramabad, a village in Khorramabad County
Asgharabad, Zagheh, a village in Khorramabad County

North Khorasan Province
Asgharabad, North Khorasan, a village in Jajrom County

Qazvin Province
Asgharabad, Qazvin, a village in Abyek County, Qazvin Province, Iran

Razavi Khorasan Province
Asgarabad, Nishapur, a village in Nishapur County

Tehran Province
Asgharabad, Tehran, a village in Robat Karim County

West Azerbaijan Province
Asgharabad, Miandoab, a village in Miandoab County
Asgharabad, Urmia, a village in Urmia County

See also
Asgarabad (disambiguation)
Askarabad (disambiguation)